Barry Bell (born June 22, 1951) is an American film, television, stage and voice actor. He is best known for portraying Steve Gayton from Stephen King's 1986 film Maximum Overdrive, Barnett Gibons from This World, Then the Fireworks 1997 film, Rocco Petrone from HBO's From the Earth to the Moon 1998, Saul Hertz from Morning 2000 film, Wilkinson from Bruno (2000) film, Lt. Feuer from  One of Her Own 1994 (TV) film, Dugan from Legacy 1999 (TV series) and as Mason, CIA from Target Earth a 1998 TV film.

Filmography

Film

Television

Video games

References

External links

1951 births
Living people
American male stage actors
American male film actors
American male television actors
American male voice actors
Actors from Raleigh, North Carolina